Closure with a twist is a property of subsets of an algebraic structure.  A subset  of an algebraic structure  is said to exhibit closure with a twist if for every two elements

Two examples of algebraic structures which exhibit closure with a twist are the cwatset and the generalized cwatset, or GC-set.

Cwatset
In mathematics, a cwatset is a set of bitstrings, all of the same length, which is closed with a twist.

Thus, two strings in C are added by adding the bits in the strings modulo 2 (that is, addition without carry, or exclusive disjunction).

Closure with a twist now means that for each element c in C, there exists some permutation  such that, when you add c to an arbitrary element e in the cwatset and then apply the permutation, the result will also be an element of C. That is, denoting addition without carry by , C will be a cwatset if and only if

This condition can also be written as

Examples

An example of a cwatset which is not a group is

F = {000,110,101}.

To demonstrate that F is a cwatset, observe that
 F + 000 = F.
 F + 110 = {110,000,011}, which is F with the first two bits of each string transposed.
 F + 101 = {101,011,000}, which is the same as F after exchanging the first and third bits in each string.

A matrix representation of a cwatset is formed by writing its words as the rows of a 0-1 matrix. For instance a matrix representation of F is given by

To see that F is a cwatset using this notation, note that

where  and  denote permutations of the rows and columns of the matrix, respectively, expressed in cycle notation.

An example of a nongroup cwatset with a rectangular matrix representation is

Properties

Let  be a cwatset.

 The degree of C is equal to the exponent n.
 The order of C, denoted by |C|, is the set cardinality of C.
 There is a necessary condition on the order of a cwatset in terms of its degree, which is
analogous to Lagrange's Theorem in group theory.  To wit,

Theorem. If C is a cwatset of degree n and order m, then m divides .

The divisibility condition is necessary but not sufficient. For example, there does not exist a cwatset of degree 5 and order 15.

Generalized cwatset
In mathematics, a generalized cwatset (GC-set) is an algebraic structure generalizing the notion of closure with a twist, the defining characteristic of the cwatset.

Definitions 

A subset H of a group G is a GC-set if for each , there exists a  such that .

Examples 

Any cwatset is a GC-set, since  implies that .
Any group is a GC-set, satisfying the definition with the identity automorphism.
A non-trivial example of a GC-set is  where .

Properties 

A GC-set H ⊆ G always contains the identity element of G.
The direct product of GC-sets is again a GC-set.
A subset H ⊆ G is a GC-set if and only if it is the projection of a subgroup of Aut(G)⋉G, the semi-direct product of Aut(G) and G.
As a consequence of the previous property, GC-sets have an analogue of Lagrange's Theorem:  The order of a GC-set divides the order of Aut(G)⋉G.
If a GC-set H has the same order as the subgroup of Aut(G)⋉G of which it is the projection then for each prime power  which divides the order of H, H contains sub-GC-sets of orders p,,...,.  (Analogue of the first Sylow Theorem)
A GC-set is cyclic if and only if it is the projection of a cyclic subgroup of Aut(G)⋉G.

References
 .
 The Cwatset of a Graph, Nancy-Elizabeth Bush and Paul A. Isihara, Mathematics Magazine 74, #1 (February 2001), pp. 41–47.
 On the symmetry groups of hypergraphs of perfect cwatsets, Daniel K. Biss, Ars Combinatorica 56 (2000), pp. 271–288.
 Automorphic Subsets of the n-dimensional Cube, Gareth Jones, Mikhail Klin,  and Felix Lazebnik, Beiträge zur Algebra und Geometrie 41 (2000), #2, pp. 303–323.
Daniel C. Smith (2003)RHIT-UMJ, RHIT 

Abstract algebra